Veltrusy is a town in Mělník District in the Central Bohemian Region of the Czech Republic. It has about 2,300 inhabitants. It is known for the Veltrusy Mansion.

Geography
It lies in the Central Elbe Table. The town is situated on the right bank of the Vltava River.

History
The first written trustworthy mention of Veltrusy is in a deed of Ottokar I of Bohemia from 1226, but according to some sources there are also older references. Until 1410, the village was owned by the church, then it was property of various noble families, including Zajíc of Hazmburk, Smiřický, Lobkowicz and Waldstein. From the 17th century until 1945, Veltrusy was owned by the Chotek family.

Veltrusy was promoted to a market town in 1899 and to a town in 1926, but soon lost the title. In 1994, it was again promoted to a town.

Sights

The most important monument and tourist destination of the town is the Veltrusy Mansion. It is a Baroque castle with a large castle park and deer-park. The castle is open to the public and offwers sightseeing tours.

The Church of Saint John the Baptist was built in the 14th century and rebuilt in the Baroque style in the 18th century. At the beginning of the 20th century, the Neoclassical tower was added. The interior is mostly in the Rococo style. A distinctive element of the interior of the church is the cenotaph of Count Rudolf Chotek.

References

External links

Veltrusy Mansion official website

Cities and towns in the Czech Republic